Lupșanu is a commune in Călărași County, Muntenia, Romania. It is composed of five villages: Lupșanu, Nucetu, Plevna, Radu Vodă, and Valea Rusului.

Natives
 Sofronie Vulpescu

References

Communes in Călărași County
Localities in Muntenia